Sofron Dmyterko O.S.B.M. (1 June 1917 – 5 November 2008) was a Ukrainian Bishop of the Ukrainian Greek Catholic Church.

Dmyterko was born in Bychkivci, Ukraine, ordained a priest in the Religious Order of Saint Basil the Great on 14 May 1942 and ordained a bishop on 30 November 1968. He was confirmed to the Ukrainian Catholic Eparchy of Ivano-Frankivsk on 16 January 1991 and retired on 7 November 1997.

See also
Ukrainian Greek Catholic Church

External links
Catholic-Hierarchy

Bishops of the Ukrainian Greek Catholic Church
1917 births
2008 deaths
People from Ternopil Oblast
Ukrainian Austro-Hungarians
People from the Kingdom of Galicia and Lodomeria
Bishops of the Ukrainian Catholic Archeparchy of Ivano-Frankivsk